The 2014–15 Vorskla Poltava season is Vorskla's twentieth Ukrainian Premier League season, and their second season under manager Vasyl Sachko. During the season Vorskla Poltava will compete in the Ukrainian Premier League, Ukrainian Cup and in the UEFA Europa League.

Friendly matches

Pre-season

Competitions

Premier League

League table

Results summary

Results by round

Matches

Ukrainian Cup

UEFA Europa League

Qualifying round

 Žilina advance to the play-off round based on away goals rule.

References

External links 
Official website

Vorskla Poltava
FC Vorskla Poltava seasons
Vorskla Poltava